The Village of St. Bernadette is the sixth studio album by American pop singer Andy Williams and was released in early 1960 by Cadence Records. It was described by Billboard magazine as "a lovely set of pop inspirational, hymns, and religious themes".

The title song from the album entered the Billboard Hot 100 in the issue of the magazine dated December 14, 1959, and stayed on the chart for 13 weeks, peaking at number seven.

The album was released on compact disc for the first time as one of two albums on one CD by Collectables Records on September 12, 2000, the other album being Williams's late 1959 Cadence release entitled Lonely Street.  Collectables included this CD in a box set entitled Classic Album Collection, Vol. 1, which contains 17 of his studio albums and three compilations and was released on June 26, 2001.

Reception

William Ruhlmann of Allmusic wrote that "Williams applied his usual warmth. The result was not one of his most popular recordings, but one that helped further expand his appeal."

Billboard appreciated the effort. "The renditions are sincere and dedicated throughout."

Track listing

Side one
 "The Village of St. Bernadette" (Eula Parker) – 3:22
 "He's Got the Whole World in His Hands" (Traditional; arranged by Archie Bleyer) – 3:07
 "Suddenly There's a Valley" (Biff Jones, Charles Meyer) – 2:52
 "Count Your Blessings" (Irving Berlin) – 3:17
 "He" (Richard Mullan, Jack Richards) – 2:59
 "You'll Never Walk Alone" (Oscar Hammerstein II, Richard Rodgers) – 2:27

Side two
 "Our Lady of Fatima" (Gladys Gollahon) – 3:23
 "The Three Bells" (Bert Reisfeld, Jean Villard) – 3:49
 "Climb Ev'ry Mountain" (Oscar Hammerstein II, Richard Rodgers) – 3:09
 "Sweet Morning" (Kay Thompson) – 2:45
 "I Believe" (Ervin Drake, Irvin Graham, Jimmy Shirl, Al Stillman) – 2:43
 "Look for the Silver Lining" (Buddy DeSylva, Jerome Kern) – 3:29

Song information

"Look for the Silver Lining" was first popularized in the 1920 Broadway musical Sally  and had three versions make the charts in 1921: a duet Charles Harrison and Elsie Baker (who was credited as Edna Brown), another duet by Lewis James and Elizabeth Spencer, and a solo recording by Marion Harris.  "You'll Never Walk Alone" was first included on the original cast recording of the 1945 Broadway musical Carousel, and that September Frank Sinatra spent one week with the song on the charts in Billboard magazine.   In 1950, the three recordings of "Our Lady of Fatima" that made the charts were by Red Foley,  Richard Hayes and Kitty Kallen,  and Phil Spitalny & His Hour of Charm Choir.

The French vocal group Les Compagnons de la chanson entered Billboard'''s Best Seller chart in 1952 with "The Three Bells", and The Browns put the song on the charts in 1959. Jane Froman and Frankie Laine both made appearances on the Billboard charts with "I Believe" in 1953.  "Count Your Blessings (Instead of Sheep) originated in the 1954 film White Christmas, where it is performed as a duet by Bing Crosby and Rosemary Clooney, and Eddie Fisher had a hit with the song that year as well.  The three recordings of "Suddenly There's a Valley" that made it into the top 20 positions on the Billboard charts in 1955 were by Gogi Grant, Julius LaRosa, and Jo Stafford, and Petula Clark took the song to number seven in the UK that same year.  Al Hibbler and The McGuire Sisters both made the magazine's Top 10 with recordings of the song "He" in 1955 as well.

Laurie London made it to number 12 on the UK singles chart with "He's Got the Whole World in His Hands" in 1957 and also made the top 10 on several of the Billboard charts in 1958.  "Climb Ev'ry Mountain" originated in the 1959 Broadway musical The Sound of Music'' and was covered that same year by Tony Bennett, who took the song to number 74 on the Billboard Hot 100. And Anne Shelton spent a week with "The Village of St. Bernadette" on the UK singles chart at number 27 in November 1959.

Personnel 

 Andy Williams – vocalist
 Archie Bleyer – arranger
 Dave Grusin – pianist, arranger

References

Bibliography

 
 

1960 albums
Andy Williams albums
Cadence Records albums
Gospel albums by American artists
Albums arranged by Archie Bleyer